Irina Nikolayevna Kassimova (original name: Ирина Николаевна Касимова, born  in Quaraghandy) is a Russian female weightlifter, competing in the 69 kg category and representing Russia at international competitions. 

She participated at the 2000 Summer Olympics in the 69 kg event. She competed at world championships, most recently at the 1999 World Weightlifting Championships.

Major results

References

External links
 
http://a.espncdn.com/oly/summer00/results/weightlifting.html
http://www.todor66.com/weightlifting/World/1994/Women_under_70kg.html

1971 births
Living people
Russian female weightlifters
Weightlifters at the 2000 Summer Olympics
Olympic weightlifters of Russia
Sportspeople from Karaganda
World Weightlifting Championships medalists
20th-century Russian women
21st-century Russian women